Catastia bistriatella is a species of snout moth in the genus Catastia. It was described by George Duryea Hulst, in 1895. It is found in North America, including California.

References

Moths described in 1895
Phycitini